

1874–75 season

The 1874–75 season was the first season of competitive football by Rangers.

Overview
Rangers entered the Scottish Cup for the first time and reached the second round where they lost to Dumbarton after a replay.

Between 1873 and 1879, Rangers played in their now traditional royal blue shirts and white shorts.

Scottish Cup

1875–76 season

The 1875–76 season was the second season of competitive football by Rangers.

Overview
Rangers entered the Scottish Cup for the second time. They equalled their previous best in the competition by reaching the second round where they lost to 3rd Lanark RV after a replay.

Scottish Cup

Notes

Friendlies

1876–77 season

The 1876–77 season was the third season of competitive football by Rangers.

Overview
Rangers entered the Scottish Cup for the third time. Wins over Queen's Park Juniors and Towerhill saw Rangers go one stage further than the previous two seasons as they reached the third round where they were given a bye to the fourth round. They then defeated Mauchline and Lennox to reach the semi-finals for the first time. With only three teams in the semi-finals, Rangers were the lucky ones to receive a bye straight to the final where they would play Vale of Leven. After two 1–1 draws at Hamilton Crescent, Vale finally overcame their opponents 3–2 at the original Hampden Park thanks to an 88th-minute winner from Robert Paton.

Scottish Cup

1877–78 season

The 1877–78 season was the fourth season of competitive football by Rangers.

Overview
Rangers entered the Scottish Cup for the fourth time. In the first round, they set a new club record for the biggest win after defeating Possilpark 13–0. Wins over Alexandra Athletic and Uddingston saw Rangers through to the fourth round where they lost to defending champions Vale of Leven after a replay.

Scottish Cup

1878–79 season

The 1878–79 season is the fifth season of competitive football by Rangers.

Overview
Rangers played a total of 7 competitive matches during the 1878–79 season.

Results
All results are written with Rangers' score first.

Scottish Cup

1879–80 season

The 1879–80 season is the sixth season of competitive football by Rangers.

Overview
Rangers played a total of 2 competitive matches during the 1879–80 season.

Results
All results are written with Rangers' score first.

Scottish Cup

References

See also

1874-75 season
Scottish football clubs 1874–75 season
Scottish football clubs 1875–76 season
Scottish football clubs 1876–77 season
Scottish football clubs 1877–78 season
Scottish football clubs 1878–79 season
Scottish football clubs 1879–80 season